Yorkshire Air Ambulance (YAA) is a dedicated helicopter emergency air ambulance for the Yorkshire and the Humber region of England. It was established in October 2000, and currently operates two Airbus H145 aircraft. It is an independent charity that relies solely on the donations of individuals and organisations.

History
The charity's original base is located at Nostell Priory, and has landing pads at various major hospitals around the region including Leeds General Infirmary, Hull Royal Infirmary and James Cook University Hospital in Middlesbrough. In October 2007, a second base was opened at Sheffield City Airport. The airport then closed at the end of April 2008, but a heliport facility was still provided for the use of the air ambulance and the South Yorkshire Police helicopter. In November 2010, the operational base for the Sheffield-based aircraft was moved to Bagby Airport near Thirsk.
The second aircraft then made another move in March 2012 to RAF Topcliffe, which it shares with the 645 Volunteer Gliding Squadron.

In 2012, planning permission was granted for a new operating base within the Nostell Priory estate for the Yorkshire Air Ambulance. The new site, including a hangar and aircrew accommodation, became operational in 2013. It replaced the facility at Leeds Bradford Airport.

One helicopter (formerly Helimed 99, registration G-SASH) was based at a hangar at Leeds Bradford Airport (EGNM), which enabled servicing and maintenance to be carried out overnight, leading to even quicker response times in many parts of the county. Until 2016, the helicopter was located at Nostell Priory near Wakefield, where it had a newly renovated hangar and accommodation for crew, plus offices on site. 
The aircraft was then replaced by G-YAAC (Helimed 99), a new £6million Airbus H145.

The second helicopter (Helimed 98, registration G-CEMS) was originally based at Sheffield City Airport but moved in March 2012 to RAF Topcliffe near Thirsk. A spokesman for the charity commented: "What we're looking to do is provide the very best coverage for the whole of Yorkshire, for the five million population. The people of Yorkshire are better served with an aircraft at Thirsk and one at Leeds Bradford." In 2016, the second helicopter was replaced by G-YOAA as part of the air ambulance's fleet renewal programme.

Aircraft

The first helicopter was an MBB Bo 105, but in 2005 they started using an MD 902 Explorer. The Explorer was used extensively in an air ambulance capacity throughout the UK, but is gradually being phased out of service for renewal purposes. It has five rotor blades to ensure a smooth flight which can prove particularly beneficial for patients suffering head or spinal injuries. Its compact dimensions allow it to land in confined spaces, yet it has room to carry one stretcher patient. It contains all equipment found on any front-line ambulance plus other special items.

In 2016, the two existing helicopters were replaced by two new Airbus H145, which are registered as G-YAAC (based at Nostell Priory) and G-YOAA (based at RAF Topcliffe). The new H145 helicopters cost at total of £12 million and offer lower operational and maintenance costs, as well as having night capability enabling longer hours of operation. They are expected to serve Yorkshire for the next 20 to 25 years.

The air ambulances appeared on the BBC One programme Helicopter Heroes, on Countryside 999 in series 3, and on UKTV's Helicopter ER.

Hospital landing pads
The YAA helicopters can land patients at number of hospitals across the region.
Castle Hill Hospital, Cottingham
Leeds General Infirmary, Leeds
Scarborough General Hospital, Scarborough
James Cook University Hospital, Middlesbrough
Hull Royal Infirmary, Kingston upon Hull
Huddersfield Royal Infirmary, Huddersfield
Northern General Hospital, Sheffield
Pinderfields Hospital, Wakefield
Sheffield Children's Hospital, Sheffield

Finances
The Yorkshire Air Ambulance is a charity solely maintained by donations as it receives no form of official funding. Medical and paramedic staff, however, are provided by local hospitals and the Yorkshire Ambulance Service. The resident population and visitors to Yorkshire finance the air ambulance by donations, and various fund-raising events. In the year ending March 2022, the charity raised £8.6million. It spent £5.9million, of which £4.2million was used to operate the air ambulance service.

Through the mid-2000s, Mumtaz Group of Bradford decided to give £2,000 a month for the foreseeable future.

YAA were the kit sponsor of Huddersfield Town F.C. for the 2009-10 season.

Richard Hammond's 2006 dragster crash
In September 2006, the original helicopter was involved in transporting the Top Gear presenter Richard Hammond following his high-speed accident at the former-RAF Elvington airfield near York. Following this operation, a high-profile charity appeal was launched. By 16 October, contributions to the appeal amounted to £185,770, although payment authorisation of one donation of £50,000 was declined.

See also
 Air ambulances in the United Kingdom
 Great North Air Ambulance

References

External links

 
 

Air ambulance services in England
Charities based in West Yorkshire
2000 establishments in England
Health in Yorkshire
Aviation in Yorkshire